Chaskel Besser (born Chaskiel Koszycki; February 12, 1923 – February 9, 2010) was an Orthodox rabbi for much of the 20th and early 21st century, and a member of Radomsk Chassidic movement. He lived in Manhattan, New York. He was born in Katowice, Poland and lived there until the dual Nazi and Soviet invasion of Poland in 1939. He was affiliated with Congregation B’nai Israel Chaim in New York.

His original family name, Koszycki, was changed by his father while the family still lived in Poland. His father, a successful businessman, and close associate of the Radomsker Rebbe, moved to pre-war Palestine. After Besser escaped Poland and Europe in 1939, he was reunited with his family in Tel Aviv. He came to the United States in 1949, together with members of his family.

He is the subject of a book written by Warren Kozak called The Rabbi of 84th Street. He appeared in the television program The Jews of New York talking about the experience of Jews in pre-World War II Germany.
 
Besser was the principal spiritual leader of the renewal of Polish Jewish life, and traveled there frequently to teach until not long before the end of his life. He helped to find Jews and rebuild Jewish life in Poland towards the end of the communist era, partnering with Ronald S. Lauder. This partnership established Besser as the Director of the Ronald S. Lauder Foundation for Poland.

He found Rabbi Michael Schudrich, currently Chief Rabbi of Poland, to move Poland to establish Jewish communal life, on behalf of the Lauder Foundation.  In addition to his work to restore Jewish communal life, he also helped restore many Jewish holy sites in Poland, negotiating with the Polish  government on preserving the legacy of Polish Jewry before the war. One of those Jewish cemeteries is in Oświęcim, where his maternal grandparents are buried.

Among his children are Rabbi Shlomo Besser, a rabbi and teacher active for the cemeteries of Eastern Europe and Aliza Grund, President of the women's division of the Agudah. His two other children are Mrs. Debbie Rosenberg of London, England and Rabbi Naftali Besser of Brooklyn, New York. Yisroel Besser, author of Warmed By Their Fire, is his grandson.

Rabbi Yonah Bookstein, former Director of The Ronald S. Lauder Foundation in Poland, and currently a rabbi of Pico Shul, is one of his students.  In 1992, Besser sent Bookstein to Poland to work at the Ronald S. Lauder Foundation Summer Camp with Rabbi Schudrich.

References

External links
Hasidic Rabbi Haskel Besser Documentary produced by The Jews of New York
Rabbi Haskel Besser and Pre-War Germany Produced by The Jews of New York

20th-century American rabbis
Polish emigrants to Mandatory Palestine
American Hasidic rabbis
Polish Hasidic rabbis
American people of Polish-Jewish descent
People from Katowice
1923 births
2010 deaths
Israeli emigrants to the United States